Fring may refer to:
Fring, Norfolk, English parish
Konstantin Fring, German footballer
Gus Fring, a fictional character in the American television drama series Breaking Bad and Better Call Saul

See also 
Frings (disambiguation)